This is the Operation Granby order of battle.  Operation Granby was the name given to the British Armed Forces deployment to the Middle East after the Iraqi invasion of Kuwait on 2 August 1990 and subsequent operations during the 1991 Gulf War.

British Forces Middle East (BFME) – Lieutenant General Sir Peter de la Billiere
1 (British) Armoured Division – Major General Rupert Smith
Force Maintenance Area (FMA) – Brigadier Martin White
BFME direct reporting units

British Army
 1st (British) Armoured Division
 1 Armoured Division Signal Regiment
 7th Armoured Brigade
 7th Armoured Brigade HQ and Signal Squadron (207)
 Royal Scots Dragoon Guards (Carabiniers and Greys)
 Queen's Royal Irish Hussars
 A Squadron, 1st The Queen's Dragoon Guards
 1st Battalion, The Staffordshire Regiment (Prince of Wales's)
 40 Field Regiment, Royal Artillery
 21 Engineer Regiment, Royal Engineers
 4th Armoured Brigade
 4th Armoured Brigade HQ and Signal Squadron (204)
 14th/20th King's Hussars
 1st Battalion, The Royal Scots (The Royal Regiment)
 3rd Battalion, Royal Regiment of Fusiliers
 2nd Field Regiment, Royal Artillery
 23 Engineer Regiment, Royal Engineers
 Divisional Troops
 16th/5th The Queen's Royal Lancers
 4 Regiment Army Air Corps
 26 Field Regiment, Royal Artillery
 32 Heavy Regiment, Royal Artillery
 39 Heavy Regiment, Royal Artillery
 12 Air Defence Regiment, Royal Artillery
 32 Armoured Engineer Regiment, Royal Engineers
 39 Engineer Regiment, Royal Engineers
   15 Field Support Squadron Royal Engineers
Supporting units

 1 Royal electrical and mechanical engineers
 1 Armoured Division Signal Regiment
 30 Signal Regiment
 14 Squadron 14 Signal Regiment (Electronic Warfare)
 1st Battalion Scots Guards
 1st Battalion Coldstream Guards
 1st Battalion Royal Highland Fusiliers
 1st Battalion Kings Own Scottish Borderers
 Elements of 1st Battalion Queens Own Highlanders
 1 Armoured Division Transport Regiment Royal Corps of Transport
 4 Armoured Division Transport Regiment Royal Corps of Transport
 7 Tank Transporter Regiment Royal Corps of Transport
 10 Regiment Royal Corps of Transport
 27 Regiment Royal Corps of Transport
 28 Ambulance Squadron Gurkha Transport Regiment
 52 Port Squadron Royal Corps of Transport
 1 Armoured Field Ambulance
 5 Armoured Field Ambulance
 22 Field Hospital
 23 Parachute Field Ambulance
 24 Airmobile Field Ambulance
 32 Field Hospital
 33 General Hospital
 60 Field Psychiatric Team
 205 General Hospital
 3 Ordnance Battalion Royal Army Ordnance Corps
 6 Ordnance Battalion RAOC
 6 Armoured Workshop Royal Electrical and Mechanical Engineers
 7 Armoured Workshop Royal Electrical and Mechanical Engineers
 11 Armoured Workshop Royal Electrical and Mechanical Engineers
 71 Aircraft Workshop Royal Electrical and Mechanical Engineers
 174 Provost Company Royal Military Police
 203 Provost Company Royal Military Police
 27 Group Royal Pioneer Corps
 187 Company Royal Pioneer Corps
 221 EOD Coy RAOC
 598 Company Royal Pioneer Corps
 54 Squadron Engineer Support and Ambulance Squadron Royal Corps of Transport

Royal Air Force
18 Panavia Tornado F.3s

Panavia Tornado GR.1

Panavia Tornado GR.1a
 No. 2 Squadron RAF
 No. 13 Squadron RAF

12 SEPECAT Jaguar GR.1s
 No. 6 Squadron RAF
 No. 41 Squadron RAF
 No. 54 Squadron RAF
Blackburn Buccaneer
 No. 12 Squadron RAF
 No. 208 Squadron RAF
Hawker Siddeley Nimrod
 No. 42 Squadron RAF
 No. 120 Squadron RAF
 No. 201 Squadron RAF
 No. 206 Squadron RAF
Lockheed C-130 Hercules
 No. 24 Squadron RAF
 No. 30 Squadron RAF
 No. 47 Squadron RAF
 No. 70 Squadron RAF
Handley Page Victor
 No. 55 Squadron RAF
Lockheed TriStar K.1
 No. 216 Squadron RAF
Boeing Chinook
 No. 7 Squadron RAF
 No. 18 Squadron RAF
Westland Puma HC.1
 No. 33 Squadron RAF
 No. 230 Squadron RAF

RAF Regiment

 4001 Flight RAF Regiment
Members of 4001 Flt RAF Regiment became NBC team attached to 4th Armoured Division during Desert Shield / Desert Storm and Desert Sabre
 No. 1 Squadron RAF Regiment
1 Squadron RAF Regiment were flown into Al Qaysumah to reinforce the base from RAF Germany.   Equipped with Scorpion and Spartan armoured vehicles, they reinforced Muharraq and crossed into Iraq with 1(BR) Armoured Division as the reconnaissance screen for the Division, ending the war astride the Kuwait-Basra highway.
 No. 20 Squadron RAF Regiment
20 Squadron RAF Regiment deployed to Cyprus August 1990.  One flight deployed to Muharraq late August 1990, second flight joined first in the middle of October 1990, relieved by 66 Squadron in November 1990, returned to UK after setting up airbase defence of Muharraq.
 No. 26 Squadron RAF Regiment
26 Squadron RAF Regiment, RAF Laarbruch Commander Sqn Ldr Dipper.  Deployed 28 November 1990 to 14 February 1991.  Used to defend the airfield before Patriot was even conceived.  In aftermath of the Iraqi invasion of Kuwait, the squadron deployed to Saudi Arabia and detachments saw service at Dharan, Muharraq, and Tabuk during the war.  Successfully deployed all equipment within 10 days of arrival.
 No. 34 Squadron RAF Regiment
34 Squadron RAF Regiment deployed to Bahrain and Dahrhan in August 1990
 No. 51 Squadron RAF Regiment
In aftermath of the Iraqi invasion of Kuwait, the squadron deployed to Saudi Arabia, and detachments saw service at Dharan, Muharraq, and Tabuk during the war.
 No. 58 Squadron RAF Regiment
58 Squadron RAF Regiment deployed from RAF Catterick in January 1991 to Bahrain to allow 1 Squadron RAF Regiment to deploy to the front.  With only three days notice, those three days included all kitting and ANTHRAX jabs
 No. 66 Squadron RAF Regiment

Other RAF Units 

 4626 Aeromed Evac Sqn(Co-located with 205 Fd Hosp RAMC and in Cyprus)
 United Kingdom Mobile Air Movements Squadron deployed on the first Hercules and served throughout the Gulf at all air heads and landing strips.
 Joint Helicopter Support Unit deployed with the Chinook Squadrons
 Tactical Communications Wing
 Tactical Supply Wing

Royal Navy

Aircraft Carrier
 
  (Deployed Mediterranean Sea)

Frigates
 
 
  (Deployed Mediterranean Sea)
 Type 22 frigate
 
 
 829 Naval Air Squadron with the Westland Lynx HAS.3
  (Deployed Mediterranean Sea)
  (Flagship)
 815 Naval Air Squadron with the Westland Lynx HAS.3

Destroyers
 Sheffield class
 
 815 Naval Air Squadron with the Westland Lynx HAS.3
 
 815 Naval Air Squadron with the Westland Lynx HAS.3
  
 815 Naval Air Squadron with the Westland Lynx HAS.2
 
 815 Naval Air Squadron with the Westland Lynx HAS.3
 

Command ships
 
 
 

Mine countermeasure vessels
 

Submarines
 s
 
 

Royal Fleet Auxiliary
 
 HM Royal Marines Band Commander in Chief Fleet
 846 Naval Air Squadron with 4 x Westland Sea King HC Mk4
 21 (AD) Bty RA with Javelin Air Defence System
 ]
 RFA Fort Grange
 826 with the Westland Sea King HC.5 & 846 Naval Air Squadron with the Westland Sea King HC.4
 
 
 846 Naval Air Squadron with the Westland Sea King HC.4

Fleet Air Arm
Deployed to land bases
 845 Naval Air Squadron with Westland Sea King HC.4s
 848 Naval Air Squadron with Westland Sea King HC.4s
 846 Naval Air Squadron with Westland Sea King HC.4s (Detached from RFA Argus)

Fleet Diving Group

 Fleet Diving Group A & B
 Embarked on RFA Sir Galahad
 members of FDU1 Maritime Counter terrorist Unit and members of FDU2 Worldwide Operations Unit. 
 Fleet Diving Group C
 Embarked on RFA Argus
 Members of Fleet Diving Unit 3, deep diving and Trials Team

See also
 List of Gulf War military equipment
 List of orders of battle

Notes

References

Further reading 
 
 
British Ground Force in the Gulf War, 1990–91

Gulf War orders of battle